The thiopurine drugs are purine antimetabolites widely used in the treatment of acute lymphoblastic leukemia, autoimmune disorders (e.g., Crohn's disease, rheumatoid arthritis), and organ transplant recipients.

Metabolism is catalyzed by S-methyltransferase.

Litigation over patents covering diagnostic kits to monitor the dosing of these drugs led to a US Supreme Court case, Mayo Collaborative Services v. Prometheus Laboratories, Inc. that dramatically changed the nature of patent law in the United States.

See also
 6-Mercaptopurine (6-MP)
 6-Thioguanine (6-TG)
 Azathioprine (AZA)

References

External links
 http://www.pharmgkb.org/do/serve?objId=PA2040

Purines